Stealing Sinatra is a 2003 American television film directed by Ron Underwood and starring David Arquette and William H. Macy. Macy was nominated for an Emmy Award for his performance.

The film tells the story of the kidnapping of Frank Sinatra, Jr. by Barry Keenan.

Cast
David Arquette as Barry Keenan
William H. Macy as John Irwin
James Russo as Frank Sinatra
Ryan Browning as Joe Amsler
Thomas Ian Nicholas as Frank Sinatra, Jr.

References

External links

2003 television films
2003 films
American television films
Films about Frank Sinatra
Films directed by Ron Underwood
Films scored by John Powell
Showtime (TV network) films